Nesterov is a town in Kaliningrad Oblast, Russia.

Nesterov may also refer to:

Nesterov (surname)
Nesterov, name of the town of Zhovkva in Lviv Oblast, Ukraine, before 1992
3071 Nesterov, an asteroid

See also
Nesterovsky (disambiguation)